La Fattoria 4. The fourth edition of The farm was broadcast from March 8, 2009 on Canale 5, for a total of seven episodes with the conduct of Paola Perego and Mara Venier, sent to Brazil. Opinion leaders in the study are fixed Bruganelli Sonia (also known as the wife of Paul Bonolis), the radio presenter Anna Pettinelli and Raffaello Tonon.

The contestants of the reality show are divided into "peasants" and in a smaller group that forms the "caste". Caste plays an important role: for they decide who to assign daily tasks, check if you have performed well and, most importantly, choose one of two competitors who must go to the nomination.

The transmission was won by Marco Baldini radio host who has donated the entire amount of the prize, consisting of 100,000 euros for the earthquake victims of Abruzzo.

Contestants
 Marco Baldini – Radio Host.
 Morena Funari – widow of Gianfranco Funari.
 Milo Coretti – winner of Grande Fratello 7.
 Guillaume Goufan – Model.
 Ciro Petrone – Actor.
 Lory Del Santo – Showgirl.
 Barbara Guerra – Model.
 Marianne Puglia – Model.
 Linda Batista – Model.
 Rocco Pietrantonio – Model.
 Riccardo Sardonè – Model.
 Carla Velli – Uomini e Donne Contestant
 Fabrizio Corona – Photographer.
 Giovanna Rei – Actress.
 Marina Ripa di Meana – Wife of Alessandro Lante della Rovere.
 Daniela Martani – Housemate in Grande Fratello 9.

Nominations

The Farm (franchise)